Iran Khodro (Irân Xodro), branded as IKCO, is an Iranian automaker headquartered in Tehran. IKCO was founded in 1962 as Iran National (Irân Nâsionâl). The public company manufactures vehicles, including Samand, Peugeot and Renault cars, and trucks, minibuses and buses. As of 2009, it produced 688,000 passenger cars per year.

History and development

Name
The word khodro means "automobile" in Persian, hence Iran Khodro means "Iran Automobile".

Founding
Iran Khodro was founded by Ahmad Khayami, with registered in the  capital of 100,000,000 Rls, on August 29, 1962  Aliakbar Khayami, Ahmad Khayami, Mahmoud Khayami, Marzieh Khayami and Zahra Seyedy Dashty, in Ekbatan world in Tehran.

Structure
Iran Khodro Industrial Group (IKCO) is a public joint stock company with the objective of creation and management of factories to manufacture various types of vehicles and parts as well as selling and exporting them.

Size and production
The company has become the largest vehicle manufacturer in the Middle East, Central Asia and North Africa. In Iran, it is the largest vehicle manufacturing company, having an average share of 65 percent of domestic vehicle production.

Iran Khodro, the largest car manufacturer in the Middle East, produced 774,965 units of passenger cars and commercial vehicles in 2010 and aims to produce and market 850 thousand cars in 2011.

Certifications
Iran Khodro has qualified for ISO 9001 from RW-TUV, Germany, as well as many other health, safety, and environment certificates including ISO 14001 and OHSAS 18001. The company has also obtained TÜV, TSE, GOST and some other important standard certification for its different productions.

Products and relationships

For more than three decades, Iran Khodro produced the Paykan, a car developed from the Rootes Group's Rootes Arrow range, best known as the Hillman Hunter. Paykan saloon car production was discontinued in 2005, almost thirty years after the end of Arrow production (latterly as the Chrysler Hunter) in Britain. A pick-up version was still in production until 2015. Bardo Pick-up, pick-up version of Paykan, will be replaced by a new pick-up called the  Arisun which is related  to the Samand .

Iranian-designed IKCO Samand, replaces the dated Paykan as Iran's "national car", and features a part-Iranian designed CNG/petrol dual-fuel engine in its Soren variant.

The firm has a long-term relationship with European and Asian manufacturers including PSA Peugeot Citroën, manufacturing and assembling a number of models under license from these firms. In 2009, Peugeot 206, Peugeot Pars, Peugeot 405, Peugeot Roa, and Samand sedans were IKCO's export-bound cars sent to Azerbaijan, Iraq, Armenia, Uzbekistan, Turkmenistan, Syria and Afghanistan. As at 2012, IKCO products incorporate 5-10 percent of components imported from France. IKCO's parts imports from Peugeot accounted for 700-800 million euros ($572–654 million) per year. Iran has reached 98% of self-sufficiency in producing Peugeot 405 parts and 75% in Peugeot 206 parts. By ending year 2012, Peugeot cuts its relations with Iran Khodro due to international sanctions against Iran. Four years later, in 2016, after reaching Joint Comprehensive Plan of Action between Iran and E3+3, Iran Khodro and Peugeot decided to make 50%-50% joint venture named IKAP to start the relations again.

Renault Pars is in charge of the engineering, quality control, parts supply, logistics, managing sales policies as well as marketing and customer services for Renault products in Iran and IKCO is one of its main shareholders that produces Tondar for the domestic market. Renault Pars is a joint venture, 51 percent of which belongs to Renault of France. Forty-nine percent of Renault Pars' shares is jointly held by Iran's Industrial Development and Renovation Organization, IKCO and Saipa. The company was established in 2003.

IKCO also manufactures trucks, buses and E-Class passenger cars under license from Mercedes-Benz. In a joint-venture with Daimler AG, Iran Khodro is to start production of sophisticated 900-class Mercedes-Benz engines; Daimler states that Iranian-made engines will be exported to Germany. Among Asian automotive manufacturers, IKCO is cooperating with Suzuki. Producing Suzuki Grand Vitara in IKCO's Site in Khorasan, IKCO will produce Suzuki Kizashi.

In 2012, IKCO announced that at least 3% of the company's sales will be allocated to research and development. As of 2015, the company's 7-year strategic plans for product development are in body design, die making, suspension, powertrain, trim and car electronics.

The agreement will help develop a modular automotive platform for four different vehicles, and the first passenger car of the medium segment of the market, a press release from the Italian firm said.

Production sites

IKCO has 12 production site around the globe, 6 sites in within borders of Iran and 6 other in IKCO's main export markets. In its five-year (2012–17) future growth prospective, IKCO envisions an annual manufacturing capacity of three million units, with exports of a million units per year.

Domestic plants:

Foreign sites:

Export markets
The company won the annual national prize for export activities in years 2006, 2007. Russia, Syria, Turkey, Iraq, Azerbaijan, Ukraine, Egypt, Algeria and Bulgaria are among the most important target markets for the group. Since Iran Khodro group new movement through international markets in year 2004, the company has exported more than 150,000 units of cars in different classes and models to other countries mainly in the Middle East and CIS region.

Export opportunities are restricted to relatively low volumes with $60 million worth of cars exported in 2007. By this Iran Khodro has ranked as 24th company among 100 top companies in Islamic world in year 2008. The Company has exported about 35,000 cars in year 2009. The company exported 40,000 units in 2010, including 30% of the total production of its Samand model. IKCO intends to export 9% of its output in 2011, amounting to 75,000 vehicles, before reaching 16% in exports by 2014.

Cars

IKCO 

The following table shows the cars that have been specially designed and built by IKCO:

Peugeot

Peugeot 206; a saloon version of the 206, the Peugeot 206 SD also co-developed with Peugeot in year 2005.
Peugeot 207i; by 2011, Ikco produced about 15,000-20,000 units Peugeot 207i. The production of 207i stopped in 2012 during relation cut between Ikco and Peugeot because of international sanctions against Iran.
Peugeot 405; available in saloon trims GLi and GLX and estate trim GLX
Peugeot 405 trim SLX with 1.6L 16 valve PSA TU5 engine
Peugeot 406; as CBU (about 2000 are imported to Iran by Iran Khodro)
Peugeot Pars; initially called the Peugeot Persia. Changes include a redesigned front and modernized rear
Peugeot RD; chassis and drivetrain are similar to the older Paykan but the outer body shell and appearance resemble a 405, production of this car ended in favor of the ROA.
Peugeot ROA; modified version of Peugeot RD, production of Peugeot ROA is going to halt.

IKAP

Peugeot 508
Peugeot 2008
Peugeot 301

Renault
Dacia Logan; both IKCO and Saipa produce the car as "Tondar 90".
Renault Captur

Suzuki
Suzuki Grand Vitara - Compact SUV which is divided to different 4 main models:
2000 cc engine with 4-speed automatic gearbox
2000 cc engine with 5-speed manual gearbox
2400 cc engine with 4-speed automatic gearbox
2400 cc engine with 5-speed manual gearbox
Suzuki Kizashi

Haima
Haima S7
Haima S5
Haima 8S
Haima 7X

Engines
 Peugeot engines:
 PSA XU7
 PSA TU5
 IKCO engines:
 IKCO EF family
 IKCO 3FX family

EF family 

Iran Khodro started to design a new range of engines for its products in 2007 in a joint with F.E.V of Germany. The first EF series engine officially shown to the public in 2008 is EF7 which is currently powering Samand LX car in Iran.

EF7 turbocharged engines were initially shown to the public in mid-2009 and will be installed on Soren ELX by last 2010. Other EF series engines named EF4 & EFD (Diesel) engines design  are finished and they are being tested for  mass production by Iran Khodro. In November 2009, Iran Khodro unveiled its new "national diesel engine" with fuel consumption of 5 liters per 100 kilometers in combined cycle. The engine has achieved emission standard of Euro 5, featuring a Diesel Particulate Filters (DPF) as well as a new Exhaust Gas Recirculation (EGR). The 1.5-liter turbodiesel uses advanced technology to deliver strong power and torque of 300Nm. Iran Khodro has designed the EF4 & EFD itself in consultation  with some expert engine designers.

3FX family 
IKCO 3FX engine family is a series of straight-three cylinder engines in development by IKCO to be used on class A to class C vehicles.

Platforms

 X7 platform: The first IKCO platform, the X7, was designed in 1995 with the upgrade of the Peugeot 405 platform. The first car built on this platform was Samand.
 IKP1 platform: IKCO's second proprietary platform, called IKP1, was built by upgrading the Peugeot PF1 platform. The first product of this platform is Tara. Unfortunately, some of the cars produced in Iran have seen hardly any improvement in standards for more than 20 years, Abolfazl Khalkhali, the head of the electric vehicle design team at the University of Science and Technology, has told.

Subsidiary companies
Supplying Automotive Parts Company (SAPCO)
SAPCO had been established in 1993 to manage the supplying chain of automotive parts in IKCO, with the main aim of being the best and most respected supplier of automotive parts and technical services. SAPCO also helps its suppliers to improve the quality of their products.

IKCO Spare Parts and After-Sale Services Co. (ISACO)
IKCO Spare Parts and After-Sale Services Co. (ISACO) was founded in 1977. ISACO is providing after-sale services and supplying spare parts for IKCO products throughout the country. ISACO Kish, is one of the subordinate companies of ISACO which is assigned with the task of supplying after-sale services to IKCO vehicles in the international markets. In 2011, 37 percent of the needed spare parts were globally outsourced and ISACO aims to reduce this amount to 23 percent. Iraq, Belarus, Russia, Ukraine, Venezuela, Senegal, Algeria and Tunisia are the main target markets for ISACO.

Iran Khodro Power Train Co. (IPCO)
IPCO was established in 1998. The main activity of this engineering services company is in the field of power train including design and development, testing, adjusting, product engineering, and quality assurance processes in mass production and design production. This subsidiary of IKCO is competent in other fields such as designing, installing and commissioning of testing equipments (hardware and software) of automotive parts, engines and vehicles as well.

TAM Co.
This subsidiary of IKCO was found with name "Ghateh Sazan-e Mojarab" in 1997 with the aim of creating cutting-edge has been changed to TAM Co. in 1998.
The company has designed and completed projects of the SAMAND production line in Syria, Venezuela and Senegal without help of foreign companies, relying on its own knowledge and technology. In 2012, TAM won Iran's "Most Admired Knowledge Enterprise (MAKE)" award.

SAMAND Investment Co.
Samand Investment Co. was established as a Corporation in 2004 with the purpose of the identification of investment opportunities, analysis and evaluation of the stock market and creating income for shareholders.

Iran Khodro Rail transport Industries Company (IRICO)

IRICO was established by Iran Khodro Investment Development Company in 2003 to manufacture railway rolling stock. IRICO produces metro wagon, rail bus, light rail vehicle and monorails. In March 2011, Tose-e-Tarabar Raili Iranian Co. acquired RICO from Iran Khodro.

Iran Khodro Diesel Company

Iran Khodro Diesel Company was established initially under the name of Khawar Industrial Group in early 1966. In 1999 Iran Khodro Company merged its bus and midi-bus production lines with Khawar Industrial Group truck production lines together and the new company Iran Khodro Diesel, public joint stock was established to manufacture different types of commercial vehicles for domestic and overseas markets. Iran Khodro Diesel Company exports its products to many countries.

See also

Automotive industry in Iran
List of Iranian companies

References

External links

Iran Khodro Industrial Group

 
Companies listed on the Tehran Stock Exchange
Vehicle manufacturing companies established in 1962
1962 establishments in Iran
Iranian brands
Motor vehicle engine manufacturers
Engine manufacturers of Iran